"Empty Spaces" is a song by the English progressive rock band Pink Floyd, featured as the eighth track on their 1979 rock opera The Wall. It contains a backmasked message.

Composition

The song is in the key of E minor, and is two minutes, eight seconds in length. It features a long introductory section, with solo guitar and a repetitive drumbeat, and an airport announcement, as a reference to Pink heading for a concert tour. The song reaches a climax of tension, at which point Roger Waters plays a descending blues scale over the minor dominant, B minor, cueing the start of the vocals. Roger Waters sings a short verse, ending on the phrase "How shall I complete the wall?" This track shares a backing track with "What Shall We Do Now?", sped up from D to E, with new guitar and vocals. The last beat introduces the next song, "Young Lust".

Plot
The Wall tells the story of Pink, an alienated and embittered rock star. At this point in the narrative, Pink is now grown up and married, but he and his wife are having relationship problems because of his physical distance and nearly complete emotional "wall". Pink asks himself how he should complete its construction.

Movie and live versions
On the film adaptation the song is dropped in favour of "What Shall We Do Now?", and on the recording of the live performance of this album, this song serves as an intro to "What Shall We Do Now?".

Hidden message

Directly before the lyrical section, there is a hidden message isolated on the left channel of the song. When heard normally, it appears to be nonsense. If played backwards, the following can be heard:

–Hello looker...
–Congratulations, You have just discovered the secret message.
–Please send your answer to Old Pink, care of the Funny Farm, Chalfont...
–Roger, Carolyne's on the phone!
–Okay.

Roger Waters congratulates the listener for finding this message, and jokes that they can send their answer to "Old Pink" (being either a reference to Syd Barrett, or a foreshadowing of Pink's eventual insanity), who lives in a funny farm (a term to describe a psychiatric hospital) somewhere in Chalfont. Before he can reveal the exact location, however, he gets interrupted by producer James Guthrie in the background who says Carolyne (Waters' then wife) is on the phone.

Personnel
 David Gilmour – guitars, Prophet-5 and ARP Quadra synthesizers
 Nick Mason – drums (only in the full version of the song, "What Shall We Do Now?")
 Roger Waters – lead vocals, bass, VCS3 synthesizer
 Richard Wright – piano

with:

 James Guthrie – ARP Quadra synthesizer

Further reading
 Fitch, Vernon. The Pink Floyd Encyclopedia (3rd edition), 2005. .

References

Pink Floyd songs
1979 songs
Rock ballads
Songs written by Roger Waters
Song recordings produced by Bob Ezrin
Song recordings produced by David Gilmour
Song recordings produced by Roger Waters